Channel 58 refers to several television stations:

Canada
The following television stations operate on virtual channel 58 in Canada:
 CFTF-DT-9 in Gaspé, Quebec

Mexico
The following television stations operate on virtual channel 58 in Mexico:
 XHCAW-TDT in Ciudad Acuña, Coahuila de Zaragoza

United States
The following low-power television station, which is no longer licensed, formerly broadcast on analog channel 58 in the United States:
 KDTP-LP in Phoenix, Arizona

See also
 Channel 58 branded TV stations in the United States
 Channel 58 virtual TV stations in the United States
 Local 58, a YouTube horror anthology web series created by Kris Straub

58